This is a list of the 30 highest prices paid for photographs (in US dollars unless otherwise stated). All prices include the buyer's premium, which is the auction house fee for handling the work.

List

Disputed claim
 In December 2014, Peter Lik reportedly sold a photograph titled Phantom to an anonymous bidder for $6.5 million, making it potentially the third highest price paid for a photograph. Lik's claim has been greeted with much scepticism. Claims of the sale have never been proven, and the buyer has not come forward, though a lawyer claiming to represent the buyer claims that the deal was real.

See also
List of most expensive paintings
List of most expensive sculptures
List of most expensive artworks by living artists
List of most expensive books and manuscripts
List of most expensive non-fungible tokens
List of photographs considered the most important

References

External links
Artnet top ten most expensive photographs, April 2003
The two most expensive Stieglitz photos, 2006, click thumbnails to enlarge

Most expensive photographs
Lists of photography topics
Photographs
Most Expensive
Photographs, Most Expensive